The Palestinian rocket arsenal used in the Arab–Israeli conflict includes a wide range of rockets and missiles, varying in design, size and payload capacity. Palestinian rockets include those locally made in Gaza and the West Bank as well as weapons smuggled from Iran and Syria. Rockets are used in attacks on Israel, mostly to target Israeli civilian centers in addition to Israeli military posts. Various Palestinian groups have used rockets against Israel including Fatah, Hamas, Islamic Jihad, as well as left-wing groups. Rockets are one of the main weapons produced by Palestinian militant and freedom fighter groups.

Types of rockets

 al Nasser – used by Popular Resistance Committees and left-wing militant organizations
 al Nasser-3
 al Nasser-4
 al Quds – a homemade rocket used by Islamic Jihad
Al Quds 101
Al Quds 102
 Arafat used by the Al Aqsa Martyrs Brigade and Fatah, launched from the West Bank
 Arafat 1
 Arafat 2
 Aqsa-3 – used by the Al Aqsa Martyrs Brigade and Fatah
 Bahaa – developed by Al Aksa Martyrs Brigade, named after Saed Bahaa, launched from West Bank
 Cenin – a rocket used by Fatah
 Fajr-5 – an Iranian artillery rocket first developed in the 1990s
M-75 – Gazan produced Fajr-5 rocket, used in attacks on Tel Aviv, Israel's most populated city. Hamas has produced the M-75 rockets in local workshops using the drawings and documentation supplied by Iran. The location of the workshops is unknown, though Hamas has displayed their production on Gaza television stations.
 Jenin-1 – used by Fatah
 Kafah –  used by Fatah
 Katushya – a Soviet Grad rocket, first used in 2006 in a strike that killed two Israeli Bedouin Arabs; at the time the Katushya's range exceeded the Qassam. Soviet designation for the rocket originally was M-21-OF, later changed to 9M22.
KN-103 – rocket referenced in threat by Fatah, use and existence unknown
M-302 (M302), Palestinian designation R160 (R-160) – a Chinese designed, Syrian made rocket, used in attacks on cities near Jerusalem and Haifa
Qassam (or Kassam) – a Gazan produced rocket used by Hamas
Qassam 1 – weighs 35 kilograms and is 180 centimeters long
Qassam 2 – weighs 40 kilograms and is 180 centimeters long
Qassam 3 – weighs 50 kilograms and is 220 centimeters long
Qassam 4 – weighs 40–50 kilograms and is 244 centimeters long
 Saria-2 – used by Tanzim
 Sumoud rocket – in use by the Popular Front for the Liberation of Palestine

Anti-Tank Missiles
 Yasin RPG – used by Hamas
 al Bana RPG – used and developed by Hamas, in use by other factions
 al Batar RPG – used and developed by Hamas, in use by other factions

Rocket launchers
 al Quds-3 Multiple Rocket Launcher – in use by Hamas & Islamic Jihad

Impact

 Palestinian attacks on Israel using rockets have killed 28 people, mostly civilians, and injured more than 1,900 people, but their main effect is their creation of widespread psychological trauma and disruption of daily life among the Israeli populace. Medical studies in Sderot, the Israeli city closest to the Gaza Strip, have documented a post-traumatic stress disorder incidence among young children of almost 50%, as well as high rates of depression and miscarriage.

See also
Palestinian rocket attacks

References

 
Israeli–Palestinian conflict